The Champion Trainer of National Hunt racing in Great Britain is the trainer whose horses have won the most prize money during a season. The list below shows the Champion Trainer for each season since 1945–46.

Winners

 1945–46 - Tommy Rayson
 1946–47 - Fulke Walwyn
 1947–48 - Fulke Walwyn
 1948–49 - Fulke Walwyn
 1949–50 - Peter Cazalet
 1950–51 - Fred Rimell
 1951–52 - Neville Crump
 1952–53 - Vincent O'Brien
 1953–54 - Vincent O'Brien
 1954–55 - Ryan Price
 1955–56 - William Hall
 1956–57 - Neville Crump
 1957–58 - Fulke Walwyn
 1958–59 - Ryan Price
 1959–60 - Peter Cazalet
 1960–61 - Fred Rimell
 1961–62 - Ryan Price
 1962–63 - Keith Piggott
 1963–64 - Fulke Walwyn
 1964–65 - Peter Cazalet
 1965–66 - Ryan Price
 1966–67 - Ryan Price
 1967–68 - Denys Smith
 1968–69 - Fred Rimell
 1969–70 - Fred Rimell
 1970–71 - Fred Winter
 1971–72 - Fred Winter
 1972–73 - Fred Winter
 1973–74 - Fred Winter
 1974–75 - Fred Winter
 1975–76 - Fred Rimell
 1976–77 - Fred Winter
 1977–78 - Fred Winter
 1978–79 - Peter Easterby
 1979–80 - Peter Easterby
 1980–81 - Peter Easterby
 1981–82 - Michael Dickinson
 1982–83 - Michael Dickinson
 1983–84 - Michael Dickinson
 1984–85 - Fred Winter
 1985–86 - Nicky Henderson
 1986–87 - Nicky Henderson
 1987–88 - David Elsworth
 1988–89 - Martin Pipe
 1989–90 - Martin Pipe
 1990–91 - Martin Pipe
 1991–92 - Martin Pipe
 1992–93 - Martin Pipe
 1993–94 - David Nicholson
 1994–95 - David Nicholson
 1995–96 - Martin Pipe
 1996–97 - Martin Pipe
 1997–98 - Martin Pipe
 1998–99 - Martin Pipe
 1999–00 - Martin Pipe
 2000–01 - Martin Pipe
 2001–02 - Martin Pipe
 2002–03 - Martin Pipe
 2003–04 - Martin Pipe
 2004–05 - Martin Pipe
 2005–06 - Paul Nicholls
 2006–07 - Paul Nicholls
 2007–08 - Paul Nicholls
 2008–09 - Paul Nicholls
 2009–10 - Paul Nicholls
 2010–11 - Paul Nicholls
 2011–12 - Paul Nicholls
 2012–13 - Nicky Henderson
 2013–14 - Paul Nicholls
 2014–15 - Paul Nicholls
 2015–16 - Paul Nicholls
 2016–17 - Nicky Henderson
 2017–18 - Nicky Henderson
 2018–19 - Paul Nicholls
 2019–20 - Nicky Henderson
 2020-21
 2021-22 - Paul Nicholls

Records
Most titles - 15, Martin Pipe
Most consecutive titles - 10, Martin Pipe (1996–2005)

See also
 British jump racing Champion Jockey
 British flat racing Champion Trainer
 British flat racing Champion Jockey

References

Racehorse training awards
Horse racing in Great Britain